Stier:

 Elizabeth Fleming Stier Award, German
 German auxiliary cruiser Stier
 Stier (eisbrecher), an icebreaker operated by the Wasser und Schifffahrtsamt

Surnames 
 Dieter Stier (born 1964), German politician
 Hubert Oswald Stier (1838-1907), German architect
 Wilhelm Stier (1799-1856), German architect

See also 
 Stier (surname)